Lucas Hamilton (born 12 February 1996) is an Australian cyclist, who currently rides for UCI WorldTeam .

Hamilton qualified for the Tokyo 2020 Olympics and rode in the Men's Road Race. The men's road racers had a tough time in the conditions and he finished 71st.

Early years 
Hamilton began cycling as a 12-years-old with the Ararat and Districts Cycling Club in Victoria. He performed so well that he was given a Victorian Institute of Sport scholarship in 2014.

Hamilton gained his first national team selection at the age of 20, in 2016. He raced in the U19 World Road Race Championship and then went onto win the Mountains Classification at the 2016 Tour de l'Avenir. This event  is widely regarded as the U23 Tour de France Overall he managed to finish the event as runner-up.

Career 
Hamilton signed a three-year deal with Mitchelton–Scott in 2017. In the same year he won the U23 Oceania Road Race Championships and finished an impressive second overall at the 2017 Giro Ciclistico d'Italia, GP Palio del Recioto and GP Marmo.

Hamilton was named Best Young Rider for Australia's World Tour one-day classic and the Cadel Evans Great Ocean Road Race. He joined the World Tour with Mitchelton–Scott in 2018, and has since continued to rise in the world standings. He won Stage 1 and Stage 2 at the 2018 Hammer Stavange, and in 2019 won Stage 1 and Stage 4 at the Czech Cycling Tour.

Returning to Australia for the 2020 Tour Down Under, Hamilton came ninth place. He went on to be placed second at the 2020 National Road Race Championships. That same year, Lucas won his maiden World Tour win on stage four of Tirreno Adriatico.

Hamilton has begun his fourth professional year signing with Team BikeExchange. He led the team at the 2021 Tour de France in their general classification campaign.

Major results

2014
 1st  Road race, Oceania Junior Road Championships
 1st  Road race, National Junior Road Championships
2016
 2nd Overall An Post Rás
2017
 1st  Road race, Oceania Road Championships
 1st  Overall Tour Alsace
1st  Young rider classification
1st  Mountains classification
 2nd Overall Giro Ciclistico d'Italia
1st Stage 5b (ITT)
 2nd Trofeo Edil C
 2nd Giro del Belvedere
 2nd GP Palio del Recioto
 3rd Overall Toscana-Terra di Ciclismo
 3rd Liège–Bastogne–Liège Espoirs
 4th Overall Tour de l'Avenir
 7th Overall Herald Sun Tour
2018
 7th Overall Settimana Internazionale di Coppi e Bartali
2019
 1st  Overall Settimana Internazionale di Coppi e Bartali
1st  Young rider classification
1st Stage 1b (TTT)
 2nd Overall Czech Cycling Tour
1st Stages 1 (TTT) & 4
 6th Overall Herald Sun Tour
2020
 1st Stage 4 Tirreno–Adriatico
 1st Stage 1 (TTT) Czech Cycling Tour
 2nd Road race, National Road Championships
 9th Overall Tour Down Under
2021
 4th Overall Paris–Nice
 5th Time trial, National Road Championships
 8th Overall Tour de Romandie
 10th Overall Volta a Catalunya

General classification results timeline

References

External links

1996 births
Living people
Australian male cyclists
People from Far North Queensland
Olympic cyclists of Australia
Cyclists at the 2020 Summer Olympics
20th-century Australian people
21st-century Australian people